Betty Tom Chu is an American lawyer, politician and banker. She is known for being the first Chinese-American woman to pass the bar admission of State Bar of California. She was also the first Chinese-American woman to be the chief executive of a bank.

Chu served as mayor of Monterey Park, California in 2006, and held two elected terms on the city council between 2003 and 2012. She ran for the 32nd Congressional district as a Republican in May 2009, and lost to Judy Chu.

Early life and education  
Chu was born in San Diego, California. Her father, Tom Kay Chu, owned a farm, and her mother, Yee Siu King, was an immigrant from Guangzhou.  By age nine, Chu wanted to pursue a career in law as a working class advocate, after witnessing one of the migrant workers on her father's farm be beaten.

After graduating from Grossmont High School, she earned a BS degree from University of Southern California. Chu earned a JD degree from University of Southern California.

Career 
In June 1961, Chu was admitted to the State Bar of California. In 1961, Chu became the first Chinese-American woman lawyer in Southern California. As a pioneer in the legal field, Chu's career was supported by Hiram Kwan, founder of "Kwan, Quan, Cohen, and Lum", a law firm in Los Angeles Chinatown.

In 1973, Chu was one of the founding members of East West Federal Bank (now East West Bancorp).
Chu also co-founded Trust Saving Bank and served as its Chairperson and CEO; she was the first Chinese American woman to run a bank in the United States.

She has taught classes at California College of Law and Los Angeles Community College.

In 1992, Chu was a member of the Los Angeles Police Department's Police Chief selection committee.

Chu was an elected city council member of Monterey Park, California from 2003-2007, and again 2009-2012. On March 13, 2006, Chu was sworn in as the mayor of Monterey Park. In May 2009, Chu campaigned for the 32nd Congressional district as a Republican, but she lost to Judy Chu, her cousin by marriage.

On June 11, 2012, Chu abruptly resigned from the city council and stated this was due to "philosophical differences" with other council members. According to the Pasadena Star News, she stated in a speech to the council: "Some other council members don’t spend adequate time reviewing staff reports and supporting documents … and it is evident from frequent 4-1 votes on key vital issues that facts don’t really matter because there is a deep political and philosophical divide."

On June 5, 2014, the California State Senate passed the Senate Joint Resolution 23 and 122, which is associated to formally apology for past California anti-Chinese legislation. This resolution passage is the work and request by The Apology for the Chinese Exclusion Act Committee, which Chu is one of the founding members.

In 2016, Chu was an Alternate Delegate for the Republican National Convention.

In 2018, Chu partnered with John Gee and the Chinese American Citizens Alliance of Orange County to urge Congress to pass the Congressional Gold Medal for Chinese Americans who served in World War II. With the help of Congressman Ed Royce, she was able to successfully garner bipartisan support and the bill was signed into law by President Donald Trump on December 20, 2018.

Today Chu is actively involved in local and national politics. She sits on the board of Asian Industry B2B which is founded by Marc Ang and the Chinese American Citizens Alliance of Orange County. She is also one of the key signers of the ballot argument against 2020 California Proposition 16 and sits as an Honorary Co-Chair of Californians for Equal Rights alongside Ward Connerly, Tom Campbell (California politician), Gail Heriot, and Manuel Klausner.

Personal life 
She was married to Robert Chu until his passing. They share three children. She currently resides in Orange County, CA.

Awards 
 2005 Honoree of Los Angeles Chinese American Pioneers in Law. (Chinese Historical Society of Southern California)

See also 
Asian American and Pacific Islands American conservatism in the United States
Chinese Exclusion Act
Chinese Historical Society of Southern California
List of first women lawyers and judges in California

References

External links 
 East West Bancorp profile
 Asian Industry B2B - Betty Tom Chu, Ambassador
 Chu Vs. Chu:Unique Congressional Face Off on NPR

Living people
American women bankers
American bankers
American mayors of Chinese descent
American politicians of Chinese descent
Women mayors of places in California
20th-century American women lawyers
20th-century American lawyers
California Republicans
Year of birth missing (living people)
Asian conservatism in the United States